Mahinda Nandimithra Ekanayake (born 26 December 1943 in Handala, Wattala) is a Sri Lankan politician.

Early career 
Prior to entering politics in 1989, he held a number of positions with the Rural Development Department.  At the age of 21, he worked as a rural development officer.  He was ultimately promoted to district officer and subsequently served as the Chief Officer in charge of the Rural Development Training Center at Nalanda, Matale.  During his time in the Rural Development Department, he became known as a writer and journalist.  In 1984, Nandimithra joined the growing Sri Lanka Mahajana Party.

Political career 
In 1989, after 23 years of government work, he entered politics. He was first elected to the parliament in 1989 as the Sri Lanka Freedom Party candidate in the Matale electorate. His first appointment was as the Minister of Forestry and Environment.  After several years in that post, he took over political leadership of the Central Province as the Chief Minister. He was the deputy minister of higher education, and he pledged support to Opposition Common Candidate Maithripala Sirisena at the 2015 presidential election. He is also an author and journalist who has written for many national newspapers and has written books on Buddhism.

References

 

 
 

1943 births
Ambassadors of Sri Lanka to Myanmar
Government ministers of Sri Lanka
Chief Ministers of Central Province, Sri Lanka
State ministers of Sri Lanka
Local government and provincial councils ministers of Sri Lanka
Living people
Members of the 9th Parliament of Sri Lanka
Members of the 10th Parliament of Sri Lanka
Members of the 11th Parliament of Sri Lanka
Members of the 13th Parliament of Sri Lanka
Members of the 14th Parliament of Sri Lanka
Members of the Central Provincial Council
Sinhalese politicians
Sri Lanka Freedom Party politicians
Sri Lankan Buddhists
United National Party politicians
United People's Freedom Alliance politicians